Liberty Township is one of the fifteen townships of Seneca County, Ohio, United States.  The 2010 census found 2,035 people in the township, 1,374 of whom lived in the unincorporated portions of the township.

Geography
Located in the northwestern part of the county, it borders the following townships:
Jackson Township, Sandusky County - north
Ballville Township, Sandusky County - northeast corner
Pleasant Township - east
Clinton Township - southeast corner
Hopewell Township - south
Loudon Township - southwest corner
Jackson Township - west
Scott Township, Sandusky County - northwest corner

The village of Bettsville is located in northern Liberty Township, and the unincorporated community of Kansas lies in the northwestern part of the township.

Name and history
Liberty Township was organized in 1832.

It is one of twenty-five Liberty Townships statewide.

Government
The township is governed by a three-member board of trustees, who are elected in November of odd-numbered years to a four-year term beginning on the following January 1. Two are elected in the year after the presidential election and one is elected in the year before it. There is also an elected township fiscal officer, who serves a four-year term beginning on April 1 of the year after the election, which is held in November of the year before the presidential election. Vacancies in the fiscal officership or on the board of trustees are filled by the remaining trustees.

References

External links
County website

Townships in Seneca County, Ohio
Townships in Ohio